The fourth encirclement campaign against the Jiangxi Soviet was the fourth campaign launched by the Chinese Nationalist Government in hope to destroy the Red Army in Jiangxi. The Nationalist headquarters in the provincial border of Jiangxi-Guangdong-Fujian organized nearly 400,000 men, and prepared for another major encirclement on the Chinese Soviet Republic. As a response, the Jiangxi Soviet launched the fourth counter-encirclement campaign at the Central Soviet, also called as the fourth counter-encirclement campaign at the Central Revolutionary Base. Although the Red Army achieved victory once again, their counter encirclement was not as successful as the previous ones this time, and the Red Army elsewhere suffered considerable loss when many other communist bases were lost, including two major ones.

Prelude
While launching encirclement campaigns against communist bases in the border region of Hunan – western Hubei and the border region of Hubei – Henan – Anhui, plans of the fourth encirclement against Jiangxi Soviet was already begun.  Nationalists planned to annihilate the first two communist bases and then concentrate on the last one.  He Yingqing was named as the frontline commander-in-chief and by October 1932, the nationalists had successfully completed the first half of their objective by destroying the communist bases in the border region of Hunan – western Hubei and the border region of Hubei – Henan – Anhui, and thus turned their attention to Jiangxi Soviet.

Strategies
In December, 1932, He Yingqin had completed the mobilization of more than three dozen nationalist divisions totaling over half a million troops for the fourth encirclement campaign against the Jiangxi Soviet.  The nationalist troops were divided into three fronts with Chiang Kai-shek's own troops as the central front, totaling more than 160,000.  The central front shouldered the main responsibility of attacking the communist enemy while the left and right fronts were tasked to assist the main attack in the central front.  The rest of the nationalist force consisting around sixty percent of the half a million mobilized troops were tasked to develop and man the blockade line, an effective strategy which would be proven in the next encirclement campaigns.  The nationalists planned to annihilate the communist main force in the regions of Jianning (建宁) and Lichuan (黎川).  In January, 1933, Chen Cheng, the commander of nationalist central front, further divided the nationalist troops under his command into three columns, and begun their offensive against their communist enemy.

The communists originally planned according to the new doctrines of Wang Ming by launching a preemptive strike against the nationalists before their mobilization and deployment was complete.  Communists would concentrate their forces to destroy nationalists in the regions of Fu River (Fu Jiang, 抚江) first, and then went on to score their victory in entire Jiangxi province.  To achieve this goal, the 10th Army of the Chinese Red Army crossed Letter River (Xin Jiang, 信江), and jointed forces with the 31st Division of the Chinese Red Army, forming the 11th Army of the Chinese Red Army.  By mid March, 1933, communist formed the Chinese Red Army Southeastern Front Command, which was in charge of communist forces organized into five columns in southern Jiangxi and western Fujian, to coordinate their actions with the communists in the north bearing the brunt of the fighting.

Order of battle
Nationalist order of battle (totaling over half a million):
Left front commanded by Cai Tingkai:
19th Route Army in Fujian consisted of six divisions and a brigade
Right front commanded by Yu Hanmou:
 Six divisions and a brigade stationed in southern Jiangxi and northern Guangdong
Central front totaling more than 160,000 commanded by Chen Cheng (Chiang's own troop):
1st Column commanded by Luo Zhuoying stationed in the regions of Yihuang (宜黄) and Yue'an (乐安):
11th Division
52nd Division
59th Division
2nd Column commanded by Wu Qiwei (吴奇伟) stationed in the regions of Fuzhou (抚州) and Dragon Bone's Crossing (Longgudu, 龙骨渡):
10th Division
14th Division
27th Division
90th Division
3rd Column commanded by Zhao Guantao (赵观涛) stationed in the regions of Golden Stream (Jinxi, 金溪) and Marginal Bay (Huwan, 浒湾):
5th Division
6th Division
9th Division
79th Division
Reserve of Central Front:
43rd Division
Counterguerrilla garrisons stationed at regions of Southern City (Nancheng 南城), Southern Abundance (Nanfeng, 南丰), Yue'an (乐安), Chongren (崇仁), and Eternal Abundance (Yongfeng, 永丰)
5 Divisions and 2 Brigades
Wings of RoCAF
Other nationalist forces mobilized to build and man the blockade lines.
Communist order of battle
1st Front Army of Chinese Red Army totaling over 70,000:
1st Legion
3rd Legion
5th Legion
11th Army
12th Army
21st Army
22nd Army

Initial battles
In early February, 1933, the nationalist successful strategy of holding their position in the newly built fortifications with large troops prevailed.  Zhu De and Zhou Enlai, the communist commander-in-chief and general political commissar of the Chinese Red Army realized it was simply impossible to destroy nationalist forces on the eastern bank of Fu (抚) River, and decided to lead the communist main force to cross the Fu (抚) River and attack the town of Southern Abundance (Nanfeng, 南丰) instead.  The two communist commanders also acknowledged that it was quite possible that the nationalists would not fall for the communist trick and communists had to give up the attempt to take the town of Southern Abundance (Nanfeng, 南丰) and attack Yihuang (宜黄) and Yue'an (乐安) instead, so that the nationalists could be ambushed in mobile warfare in the mountains where the numerically and technically inferior communists had advantages over their nationalist adversary.  In the evening on February 12, 1933, communist 3rd and 5th Legions of Chinese Red Army begun their attack on nationalist positions in the northwestern suburb of the town of Southern Abundance (Nanfeng, 南丰).  However, the two brigades of the nationalist 8th Division successfully fended off the communist attacks by adopting the successful tactic of holding on to their positions in the fortifications instead of getting out and engaging the enemy in the open.

Chen Cheng learned the news and immediately ordered the nationalist 24th Division to reinforce the town of Southern Abundance (Nanfeng, 南丰) and in the meantime, Chen Cheng also ordered the nationalist central front to speed southward to the region in order to trap and annihilate the communist main force.  Realizing the danger they would be in, Zhu De and Zhou Enlai decided to give up the attempt to take town of Southern Abundance (Nanfeng, 南丰).  On February 22, 1933, the 11th Army of the Chinese Red Army was ordered to disguise as the main force to move toward Lichuan (黎川) by cross the Fu (抚) River at the region of New Abundance Street (Xinfengjie, 新丰街).  While the nationalists were distracted, the communist main force secretly moved to the regions of Dongshao (东韶) and Luokou (洛口) to wait for other opportunities to attack their nationalist adversary.

Subsequent battles
He Yingqin erroneously believed that the communist main force had gathered in the region of Lichuan (黎川), and ordered the nationalist central front to attack toward Lichuan (黎川) and Guangchang (广昌).  The nationalist 1st Column was to attack and take Guangchang (广昌) and Ningdu from Yihuang (宜黄) and Yue'an (乐安).  The nationalist 2nd Column was to attack Kangdu (康都) and take from Southern City (Nancheng, 南城), Southern Abundance (Nanfeng, 南丰).  The two nationalist columns would meet at Guangchang (广昌) after annihilating their communist enemy.  The nationalist 1st Column had marched into mountains covered with thick forest, and it was isolated from the nationalist 2nd and 3rd Columns, so the communists decided to concentrate their forces to ambush nationalist 52nd and 59th Divisions of the 1st Column in the regions of Huangbi (黄陂) and Yihuang (宜黄).

On February 26, 1933, the nationalist 52nd Division and 59th Division marched toward Huangbi (黄陂) from Yue'an (乐安) on different routes, separated by Moluozhang (摩罗嶂) Mountain, and they were ambushed by the waiting communists.  From the morning of February 27 thru the afternoon of February 28, 1933, after fierce fighting, the nationalist 52nd Division was completely destroyed with its divisional commander Li Ming (李明) captured alive by the enemy.  The nationalist 59th Division suffered similar fate with its divisional commander Chen Shiji (陈时骥) also captured alive by the enemy, but a single regiment was successful in escape the enemy onslaught.

Last battles
After defeat at Huangbi (黄陂), the nationalists changed their strategy in the middle of March 1933 by attempting to break through in the center. To do so, the nationalist force was redeployed: the nationalist 2nd Column became the vanguard, while the nationalist 1st Column and the 5th Division and the 9th Division of the nationalist 3rd Column became the rearguard, and two other divisions acted as the general reserve. Nationalists attacked from regions of Dongbi (东陂) and Huangbi (黄陂) toward Guangchang (广昌), in attempt to lure out the communist main force for a decisive engagement. The communists, in turn, deployed their 11th Army disguised as their main force in to the northwest of Guangchang (广昌) to lure the nationalist vanguard further south, while the communist main force itself moved northward to ambush the nationalist rearguard.

On March 20, 1933, the 11th Division of the nationalist rearguard had reached the region between Grass Stage Hill (Caotaigang, 草台冈) and Village of Xu (Xuzhuang, 徐庄), with the surviving regiment of the nationalist 59th Division following behind.  The nationalist 9th Division was still near Dongbi (东陂) and was more than fifty kilometers away from the near nationalist forces.  On dawn of March 21, 1933, the communist first launched the surprise attack on the unsuspecting nationalist 11th Division, succeeding in completely destroying it in the region of Grass Stage Hill (Caotaigang, 草台冈).  The next day, the nationalist 9th Division at Dongbi (东陂) was badly mauled by the communists.  Hearing the news of the disaster, all other overstretched nationalist forces withdrew and ended the campaign to rest and regroup for future actions.

Aftermath
The communist victory resulted in annihilating over thirty thousands nationalist troops, including capturing more than ten thousands, in addition, the communists also managed to capture over ten thousands guns from the nationalists.  Although Mao Zedong had already lost power to Wang Ming in the internal power struggle, his successful strategies proven in the previous encirclement campaigns were adopted one last time by Zhou Enlai, who was the protégé of Wang Ming at the time, and unlike other communists elsewhere who suffered disastrous defeats, resulted in another victory.  However, the communist jubilation would not last long, for that as Wang Ming's new strategies were adopted in full, the communist defeat in Jiangxi Soviet in the next encirclement campaigns would be far more catastrophic.

Although the nationalist offensive was successfully repelled by the communists, their victory was not complete in that most of the nationalist forces withdrawn did not return to their original posts, but instead, started building blockade lines along the border of Jiangxi Soviet, thus begun the very successful tactic used in the next encirclement campaign.  Furthermore, as Mao Zedong had lost power to Wang Ming, his proven successful strategies were abolished and this campaign was the last time it was adopted.  Elsewhere, communists suffered huge losses as Wang Ming's new strategies of static defense and clashing head on with numerical and technical superior nationalist forces were adopted, resulting in communists losing most of their other bases, including two major ones, plus all of the smaller ones.

See also
List of battles of the Chinese Civil War
National Revolutionary Army
History of the People's Liberation Army
Chinese Civil War
First encirclement campaign
Second encirclement campaign
Third encirclement campaign
Fifth encirclement campaign

Conflicts in 1933
Jiangxi Soviet, encirclement campaign, 4th
1933 in China
Military history of Jiangxi